Astrid Retzke (born 13 July 1973) is a German athlete. She competed in the women's heptathlon at the 2000 Summer Olympics.

References

External links
 

1973 births
Living people
Athletes (track and field) at the 2000 Summer Olympics
German heptathletes
Olympic athletes of Germany
Sportspeople from Saxony-Anhalt
20th-century German women
21st-century German women